Rumpole Rests His Case is a 2002 collection of new short stories by John Mortimer about defence barrister Horace Rumpole. The stories were freshly written and not adapted from any previous scripts he had written for the Rumpole TV series (1978-1992). 

The stories were:
Rumpole and the Old Familiar Faces 
Rumpole and the Remembrance of Things Past 
Rumpole and the Asylum Seekers                               
Rumpole and the Camberwell Carrot                             
Rumpole and the Actor Laddie                                    
Rumpole and the Teenage Werewolf                              
Rumpole Rests His Case

References

Works by John Mortimer
2002 short story collections